Słowieńsko  is a village in the administrative district of Gmina Sławoborze, within Świdwin County, West Pomeranian Voivodeship, in north-western Poland. 

The village has a population of 320.

References

Villages in Świdwin County

pl:Słowieńsko (powiat świdwiński)